In music, Op. 25 stands for Opus number 25. Compositions that are assigned this number include:

 Beethoven – Serenade for flute, violin and viola
 Berlioz – L'enfance du Christ
 Brahms – Piano Quartet No. 1
 Britten – String Quartet No. 1
 Chausson – Poème
 Chopin – Études Op. 25
 D'Indy – Symphony on a French Mountain Air
 Dohnányi – Variations on a Nursery Tune
 Dvořák – Vanda
 Elgar – The Black Knight
 Enescu – Violin Sonata No. 3
 Holst – Sāvitri
 Klebe – Die Räuber
 Kosenko – Twenty-four Pieces for Children
 Mendelssohn – Piano Concerto No. 1
 Prokofiev – Symphony No. 1
 Rachmaninoff – Francesca da Rimini
 Rubinstein – Piano Concerto No. 1
 Sarasate – Carmen Fantasy
 Schoenberg – Suite for Piano
 Schubert – Die schöne Müllerin
 Schumann – Myrthen, twenty-six songs (4 books)
 Strauss – Guntram
 Szymanowski – Hagith